Four Stairs is a historic home located at Great Falls, Fairfax County, Virginia.  The earliest section was built about 1737, as a gable-roofed, one-room, one-story with loft log house.  It was later enlarged with a shed-roofed west side log pen and rear shed-roofed timber-framed kitchen. These early sections were raised to two-stories after 1796.  A two-story, three-bay, parlor-and-side-hall-plan frame addition in the Greek Revival style was built about 1850, and became the focus of the house. The house was restored in 2002–2004. Also on the property are a contributing a family cemetery and a stone-lined hand-dug well.

It was listed on the National Register of Historic Places in 2004.

References

Houses on the National Register of Historic Places in Virginia
Greek Revival houses in Virginia
Houses completed in 1737
Houses in Fairfax County, Virginia
National Register of Historic Places in Fairfax County, Virginia